A polytope is a geometric object with flat sides, which exists in any general number of dimensions. The following list of polygons, polyhedra and polytopes gives the names of various classes of polytopes and lists some specific examples.

Polytope elements

Polygon (2-polytope)
Vertex
Edge the facet or (n−1)-face of the polygon

Polyhedron (3-polytope)
Vertex the peak or (n−3)-face of the polyhedron
Edge the ridge or (n−2)-face of the polyhedron
Face the facet or (n−1)-face of the polyhedron

4-polytope
Vertex
Edge the peak or (n−3)-face of the 4-polytope
Face the ridge or (n−2)-face of the 4-polytope
Cell the facet or (n−1)-face of the 4-polytope

5-polytope
Vertex the (n−5)-face of the 5-polytope
Edge the (n−4)-face of the 5-polytope
Face the peak or (n−3)-face of the 5-polytope
Cell the ridge or (n−2)-face of the 5-polytope
Hypercell or Teron the facet or (n−1)-face of the 5-polytope

Other
Point
Line segment
Vertex figure
Peak – (n−3)-face
Ridge – (n−2)-face
Facet – (n−1)-face

Two dimensional (polygons)
Triangle
Equilateral triangle
Isosceles triangle
Scalene triangle, Right triangle

Quadrilateral
Rectangle
Square
Rhombus
Parallelogram
Trapezoid
Isosceles trapezoid
Kite
Rhomboid

Pentagon
Hexagon
Heptagon
Octagon
Nonagon
Decagon
Hendecagon
Dodecagon
Triskaidecagon
Tetradecagon
Pentadecagon
Hexadecagon
Heptadecagon
Octadecagon
Enneadecagon
Icosagon
Icosihenagon
Icosidigon
Icositrigon
Icositetragon
Icosipentagon
Icosihexagon
Icosiheptagon
Icosioctagon
Icosienneagon
Triacontagon
Tetracontagon
hectogon
257-gon
Chiliagon
Myriagon
65537-gon
Megagon
Gigagon
Teragon
Apeirogon

Star polygons
Pentagram
Hexagram
Heptagram
Octagram
Enneagram
Decagram
Hendecagram
Dodecagram

Families
Concave polygon
Cyclic polygon
Regular polygon
Polyform
Gnomon
Golygon

Tilings
List of uniform tilings

Uniform tilings in hyperbolic plane

Archimedean tiling
Square tiling
Triangular tiling
Hexagonal tiling
Truncated square tiling
Snub square tiling
Trihexagonal tiling
Truncated hexagonal tiling
Rhombitrihexagonal tiling
Truncated trihexagonal tiling
Snub hexagonal tiling
Elongated triangular tiling

Three dimensional (polyhedra)
Three-dimensional space

Regular
Regular polyhedron
Platonic solid:
Tetrahedron, Cube, Octahedron, Dodecahedron, Icosahedron
Regular spherical polyhedron
Dihedron, Hosohedron
Kepler–Poinsot polyhedron (Regular star polyhedra)
Small stellated dodecahedron, Great stellated dodecahedron, Great icosahedron, Great dodecahedron
Abstract regular polyhedra (Projective polyhedron)
Hemicube (geometry), hemi-octahedron, hemi-dodecahedron, hemi-icosahedron

Tetrahedron
Disphenoid
Pentahedron
Square pyramid, Triangular prism
Hexahedron
Parallelepiped, Cuboid, Rhombohedron, Trigonal trapezohedron, Cube, Pentagonal pyramid, Triangular dipyramid, quadrilateral frustum
Heptahedron
hexagonal pyramid, pentagonal prism, tetrahemihexahedron
Octahedron
Hexagonal prism, Truncated tetrahedron, Tetragonal trapezohedron
Enneahedron
Octagonal pyramid, Heptagonal prism
Decahedron
Octagonal prism, Square antiprism, Square cupola, Pentagonal dipyramid, Augmented pentagonal prism
Dodecahedron
Pentagonal antiprism, Decagonal prism, Pentagonal cupola, Snub disphenoid, Elongated square dipyramid, Metabidiminished icosahedron, Hexagonal bipyramid, Hexagonal trapezohedron, Triakis tetrahedron, Rhombic dodecahedron, Hendecagonal pyramid, Trapezo-rhombic dodecahedron, Rhombo-hexagonal dodecahedron

Archimedean solids
Archimedean solid
Truncated tetrahedron, Cuboctahedron, Truncated cube, Truncated octahedron, Rhombicuboctahedron, Truncated cuboctahedron, Snub cube, Icosidodecahedron, Truncated dodecahedron, Truncated icosahedron, Rhombicosidodecahedron, Truncated icosidodecahedron, Snub dodecahedron

Prisms and antiprisms
Prism
Triangular prism, Pentagonal prism, Hexagonal prism, Heptagonal prism, Octagonal prism, Enneagonal prism, Decagonal prism, Hendecagonal prism, Dodecagonal prism
Antiprism
Square antiprism, Pentagonal antiprism, Hexagonal antiprism, Heptagonal antiprism, Octagonal antiprism, Enneagonal antiprism, Decagonal antiprism, Dodecagonal antiprism

Catalan solids
Catalan solid
Triakis tetrahedron, Rhombic dodecahedron, Triakis octahedron, Tetrakis hexahedron, Deltoidal icositetrahedron, Disdyakis dodecahedron, Pentagonal icositetrahedron, Rhombic triacontahedron, Triakis icosahedron, Pentakis dodecahedron, Deltoidal hexecontahedron, Disdyakis triacontahedron, Pentagonal hexecontahedron

Bipyramids and Trapezohedron
Bipyramid
Triangular dipyramid, Pentagonal dipyramid, Hexagonal bipyramid, Octagonal bipyramid, Decagonal bipyramid
Trapezohedron

Uniform star polyhedra
Uniform star polyhedron
Cubitruncated cuboctahedron
Cubohemioctahedron
Ditrigonal dodecadodecahedron
Dodecadodecahedron
Great cubicuboctahedron
Great dirhombicosidodecahedron
Great disnub dirhombidodecahedron
Great ditrigonal dodecicosidodecahedron
Great ditrigonal icosidodecahedron
Great dodecahemicosahedron
Great dodecahemidodecahedron
Great dodecicosahedron
Great dodecicosidodecahedron
Great icosicosidodecahedron
Great icosidodecahedron
Great icosihemidodecahedron
Great inverted snub icosidodecahedron
Great retrosnub icosidodecahedron
Great rhombidodecahedron
Great rhombihexahedron
Great snub dodecicosidodecahedron
Great snub icosidodecahedron
Great stellated truncated dodecahedron
Great truncated cuboctahedron
Great truncated icosidodecahedron
Icosidodecadodecahedron
Icositruncated dodecadodecahedron
Inverted snub dodecadodecahedron
Nonconvex great rhombicosidodecahedron
Nonconvex great rhombicuboctahedron
Octahemioctahedron
Rhombicosahedron
Rhombidodecadodecahedron
Small cubicuboctahedron
Small ditrigonal dodecicosidodecahedron
Small ditrigonal icosidodecahedron
Small dodecahemicosahedron
Small dodecahemidodecahedron
Small dodecicosahedron
Small dodecicosidodecahedron
Small icosicosidodecahedron
Small icosihemidodecahedron
Small retrosnub icosicosidodecahedron
Small rhombidodecahedron
Small rhombihexahedron
Small snub icosicosidodecahedron
Small stellated truncated dodecahedron
Snub dodecadodecahedron
Snub icosidodecadodecahedron
Stellated truncated hexahedron
Tetrahemihexahedron
Truncated dodecadodecahedron
Truncated great dodecahedron
Truncated great icosahedron

Uniform prismatic star polyhedra
Prismatic uniform polyhedron
Pentagrammic prism, Pentagrammic antiprism, Pentagrammic crossed-antiprism
Heptagrammic antiprism (7/2), Heptagrammic antiprism (7/3)
Enneagrammic antiprism (9/2). Enneagrammic antiprism (9/4)
Enneagrammic crossed-antiprism, Enneagrammic prism (9/2), Enneagrammic prism (9/4)
Decagrammic prism, Decagrammic antiprism

Johnson solids
Johnson solid
Augmented dodecahedron
Augmented hexagonal prism
Augmented pentagonal prism
Augmented sphenocorona
Augmented triangular prism
Augmented tridiminished icosahedron
Augmented truncated cube
Augmented truncated dodecahedron
Augmented truncated tetrahedron
Biaugmented pentagonal prism
Biaugmented triangular prism
Biaugmented truncated cube
Bigyrate diminished rhombicosidodecahedron
Bilunabirotunda
Diminished rhombicosidodecahedron
Disphenocingulum
Elongated pentagonal bipyramid
Elongated pentagonal cupola
Elongated pentagonal gyrobicupola
Elongated pentagonal gyrobirotunda
Elongated pentagonal gyrocupolarotunda
Elongated pentagonal orthobicupola
Elongated pentagonal orthobirotunda
Elongated pentagonal orthocupolarotunda
Elongated pentagonal pyramid
Elongated pentagonal rotunda
Elongated square bipyramid
Elongated square cupola
Elongated square gyrobicupola
Elongated square pyramid
Elongated triangular bipyramid
Elongated triangular cupola
Elongated triangular gyrobicupola
Elongated triangular orthobicupola
Elongated triangular pyramid
Gyrate bidiminished rhombicosidodecahedron
Gyrate rhombicosidodecahedron
Gyrobifastigium
Gyroelongated pentagonal bicupola
Gyroelongated pentagonal birotunda
Gyroelongated pentagonal cupola
Gyroelongated pentagonal cupolarotunda
Gyroelongated pentagonal pyramid
Gyroelongated pentagonal rotunda
Gyroelongated square bicupola
Gyroelongated square bipyramid
Gyroelongated square cupola
Gyroelongated square pyramid
Gyroelongated triangular bicupola
Gyroelongated triangular cupola
Hebesphenomegacorona
Metabiaugmented dodecahedron
Metabiaugmented hexagonal prism
Metabiaugmented truncated dodecahedron
Metabidiminished icosahedron
Metabidiminished rhombicosidodecahedron
Metabigyrate rhombicosidodecahedron
Metagyrate diminished rhombicosidodecahedron
Parabiaugmented dodecahedron
Parabiaugmented hexagonal prism
Parabiaugmented truncated dodecahedron
Parabidiminished rhombicosidodecahedron
Parabigyrate rhombicosidodecahedron
Paragyrate diminished rhombicosidodecahedron
Pentagonal bipyramid
Pentagonal cupola
Pentagonal gyrobicupola
Pentagonal gyrocupolarotunda
Pentagonal orthobicupola
Pentagonal orthobirotunda
Pentagonal orthocupolarotunda
Pentagonal pyramid
Pentagonal rotunda
Snub disphenoid
Snub square antiprism
Sphenocorona
Sphenomegacorona
Square cupola
Square gyrobicupola
Square orthobicupola
Square pyramid
Triangular bipyramid
Triangular cupola
Triangular hebesphenorotunda
Triangular orthobicupola
Triaugmented dodecahedron
Triaugmented hexagonal prism
Triaugmented triangular prism
Triaugmented truncated dodecahedron
Tridiminished icosahedron
Tridiminished rhombicosidodecahedron
Trigyrate rhombicosidodecahedron

Dual uniform star polyhedra
Great complex icosidodecahedron
Great deltoidal hexecontahedron
Great deltoidal icositetrahedron
Great dirhombicosidodecacron
Great dirhombicosidodecahedron
Great disdyakis dodecahedron
Great disdyakis triacontahedron
Great disnub dirhombidodecacron
Great ditrigonal dodecacronic hexecontahedron
Great dodecacronic hexecontahedron
Great dodecahemicosacron
Great dodecicosacron
Great hexacronic icositetrahedron
Great hexagonal hexecontahedron
Great icosacronic hexecontahedron
Great icosihemidodecacron
Great inverted pentagonal hexecontahedron
Great pentagonal hexecontahedron
Great pentagrammic hexecontahedron
Great pentakis dodecahedron
Great rhombic triacontahedron
Great rhombidodecacron
Great rhombihexacron
Great stellapentakis dodecahedron
Great triakis icosahedron
Great triakis octahedron
Great triambic icosahedron
Medial deltoidal hexecontahedron
Medial disdyakis triacontahedron
Medial hexagonal hexecontahedron
Medial icosacronic hexecontahedron
Medial inverted pentagonal hexecontahedron
Medial pentagonal hexecontahedron
Medial rhombic triacontahedron
Hexahemioctacron
Hemipolyhedron
Octahemioctacron
Rhombicosacron
Small complex icosidodecahedron
Small ditrigonal dodecacronic hexecontahedron
Small dodecacronic hexecontahedron
Small dodecahemicosacron
Small dodecahemidodecacron
Small dodecicosacron
Small hexacronic icositetrahedron
Small hexagonal hexecontahedron
Small hexagrammic hexecontahedron
Small icosacronic hexecontahedron
Small icosihemidodecacron
Small rhombidodecacron
Small rhombihexacron
Small stellapentakis dodecahedron
Small triambic icosahedron
Tetrahemihexacron

Honeycombs
Convex uniform honeycomb
Cubic honeycomb
Truncated cubic honeycomb
Bitruncated cubic honeycomb
Cantellated cubic honeycomb
Cantitruncated cubic honeycomb
Rectified cubic honeycomb
Runcitruncated cubic honeycomb
Omnitruncated cubic honeycomb
Tetrahedral-octahedral honeycomb
Truncated alternated cubic honeycomb
Cantitruncated alternated cubic honeycomb
Runcinated alternated cubic honeycomb
Quarter cubic honeycomb
Gyrated tetrahedral-octahedral honeycomb
Gyrated triangular prismatic honeycomb
Gyroelongated alternated cubic honeycomb
Gyroelongated triangular prismatic honeycomb
Elongated triangular prismatic honeycomb
Elongated alternated cubic honeycomb
Hexagonal prismatic honeycomb
Triangular prismatic honeycomb
Triangular-hexagonal prismatic honeycomb
Truncated hexagonal prismatic honeycomb
Truncated square prismatic honeycomb
Rhombitriangular-hexagonal prismatic honeycomb
Omnitruncated triangular-hexagonal prismatic honeycomb
Snub triangular-hexagonal prismatic honeycomb
Snub square prismatic honeycomb

Dual uniform honeycomb
Disphenoid tetrahedral honeycomb
Rhombic dodecahedral honeycomb

Others
Trapezo-rhombic dodecahedral honeycomb
Weaire–Phelan structure

Convex uniform honeycombs in hyperbolic space
Order-4 dodecahedral honeycomb
Order-5 cubic honeycomb
Order-5 dodecahedral honeycomb
Icosahedral honeycomb

Other
Apeirogonal prism
Apeirohedron
Bicupola
Cupola
Bifrustum
Boerdijk–Coxeter helix
Császár polyhedron
Flexible polyhedron
Gyroelongated square bipyramid
Heronian tetrahedron
Hexagonal bifrustum
Hexagonal truncated trapezohedron
Hill tetrahedron
Holyhedron
Infinite skew polyhedron
Jessen's icosahedron
Near-miss Johnson solid
Parallelepiped
Pentagonal bifrustum
Polytetrahedron
Pyritohedron
Rhombic enneacontahedron
Rhombic icosahedron
Rhombo-hexagonal dodecahedron
Rhombohedron
Scalenohedron
Schönhardt polyhedron
Square bifrustum
Square truncated trapezohedron
Szilassi polyhedron
Tetradecahedron
Tetradyakis hexahedron
Tetrated dodecahedron
Triangular bifrustum
Triaugmented triangular prism
Truncated rhombic dodecahedron
Truncated trapezohedron
Truncated triakis tetrahedron
Tridyakis icosahedron
Trigonal trapezohedron
Regular skew polyhedron
Waterman polyhedron
Wedge

Regular and uniform compound polyhedra
Polyhedral compound and Uniform polyhedron compound
Compound of cube and octahedron
Compound of dodecahedron and icosahedron
Compound of eight octahedra with rotational freedom
Compound of eight triangular prisms
Compound of five cubes
Compound of five cuboctahedra
Compound of five cubohemioctahedra
Compound of five great cubicuboctahedra
Compound of five great dodecahedra
Compound of five great icosahedra
Compound of five great rhombihexahedra
Compound of five icosahedra
Compound of five octahedra
Compound of five octahemioctahedra
Compound of five small cubicuboctahedra
Compound of five small rhombicuboctahedra
Compound of five small rhombihexahedra
Compound of five small stellated dodecahedra
Compound of five stellated truncated cubes
Compound of five tetrahedra
Compound of five tetrahemihexahedra
Compound of five truncated cubes
Compound of five truncated tetrahedra
Compound of five uniform great rhombicuboctahedra
Compound of four hexagonal prisms
Compound of four octahedra
Compound of four octahedra with rotational freedom
Compound of four tetrahedra
Compound of four triangular prisms
Compound of great icosahedron and great stellated dodecahedron
Compound of six cubes with rotational freedom
Compound of six decagonal prisms
Compound of six decagrammic prisms
Compound of six pentagonal prisms
Compound of six pentagrammic crossed antiprisms
Compound of six pentagrammic prisms
Compound of six tetrahedra
Compound of six tetrahedra with rotational freedom
Compound of small stellated dodecahedron and great dodecahedron
Compound of ten hexagonal prisms
Compound of ten octahedra
Compound of ten tetrahedra
Compound of ten triangular prisms
Compound of ten truncated tetrahedra
Compound of three cubes
Compound of three tetrahedra
Compound of twelve pentagonal antiprisms with rotational freedom
Compound of twelve pentagonal prisms
Compound of twelve pentagrammic prisms
Compound of twelve tetrahedra with rotational freedom
Compound of twenty octahedra
Compound of twenty octahedra with rotational freedom
Compound of twenty tetrahemihexahedra
Compound of twenty triangular prisms
Compound of two great dodecahedra
Compound of two great icosahedra
Compound of two great inverted snub icosidodecahedra
Compound of two great retrosnub icosidodecahedra
Compound of two great snub icosidodecahedra
Compound of two icosahedra
Compound of two inverted snub dodecadodecahedra
Compound of two small stellated dodecahedra
Compound of two snub cubes
Compound of two snub dodecadodecahedra
Compound of two snub dodecahedra
Compound of two snub icosidodecadodecahedra
Compound of two truncated tetrahedra
Prismatic compound of antiprisms
Prismatic compound of antiprisms with rotational freedom
Prismatic compound of prisms
Prismatic compound of prisms with rotational freedom

Four dimensions
Four-dimensional space
4-polytope – general term for a four dimensional polytope

Regular 4-polytope
5-cell, Tesseract, 16-cell, 24-cell, 120-cell, 600-cell

Abstract regular polytope
11-cell, 57-cell

Regular star 4-polytope
Icosahedral 120-cell, Small stellated 120-cell, Great 120-cell, Grand 120-cell, Great stellated 120-cell, Grand stellated 120-cell, Great grand 120-cell, Great icosahedral 120-cell, Grand 600-cell, Great grand stellated 120-cell

Uniform 4-polytope
Rectified 5-cell, Truncated 5-cell, Cantellated 5-cell, Runcinated 5-cell
Rectified tesseract, Truncated tesseract, Cantellated tesseract, Runcinated tesseract
Rectified 16-cell, Truncated 16-cell
Rectified 24-cell, Truncated 24-cell, Cantellated 24-cell, Runcinated 24-cell, Snub 24-cell
Rectified 120-cell, Truncated 120-cell, Cantellated 120-cell, Runcinated 120-cell
Rectified 600-cell, Truncated 600-cell, Cantellated 600-cell

Prismatic uniform 4-polytope
Grand antiprism
Duoprism
Tetrahedral prism, Truncated tetrahedral prism
Truncated cubic prism, Truncated octahedral prism, Cuboctahedral prism, Rhombicuboctahedral prism, Truncated cuboctahedral prism, Snub cubic prism
Truncated dodecahedral prism, Truncated icosahedral prism, Icosidodecahedral prism, Rhombicosidodecahedral prism, Truncated icosidodecahedral prism, Snub dodecahedral prism

Uniform antiprismatic prism
Triangular antiprismatic prism, Square antiprismatic prism, Pentagonal antiprismatic prism, Hexagonal antiprismatic prism, Heptagonal antiprismatic prism, Octagonal antiprismatic prism, Enneagonal antiprismatic prism, Decagonal antiprismatic prism
Pentagrammic antiprismatic prism, Hexagrammic antiprismatic prism, Heptagrammic antiprismatic prism, Octagrammic antiprismatic prism, Enneagrammic antiprismatic prism, Decagrammic antiprismatic prism
Pentagrammic crossed antiprismatic prism, Hexagrammic crossed antiprismatic prism, Heptagrammic crossed antiprismatic prism, Octagrammic crossed antiprismatic prism, Enneagrammic crossed antiprismatic prism, Decagrammic crossed antiprismatic prism

Honeycombs
Tesseractic honeycomb
24-cell honeycomb
Snub 24-cell honeycomb
Rectified 24-cell honeycomb
Truncated 24-cell honeycomb
16-cell honeycomb
5-cell honeycomb
Omnitruncated 5-cell honeycomb
Truncated 5-cell honeycomb
Omnitruncated 5-simplex honeycomb

Five dimensions
Five-dimensional space, 5-polytope and uniform 5-polytope
5-simplex, Rectified 5-simplex, Truncated 5-simplex, Cantellated 5-simplex, Runcinated 5-simplex, Stericated 5-simplex
5-demicube, Truncated 5-demicube, Cantellated 5-demicube, Runcinated 5-demicube
5-cube, Rectified 5-cube, 5-cube, Truncated 5-cube, Cantellated 5-cube, Runcinated 5-cube, Stericated 5-cube
5-orthoplex, Rectified 5-orthoplex, Truncated 5-orthoplex, Cantellated 5-orthoplex, Runcinated 5-orthoplex

Prismatic uniform 5-polytope
5-cell prism, Rectified 5-cell prism, Truncated 5-cell prism, Cantellated 5-cell prism, Runcinated 5-cell prism, Bitruncated 5-cell prism, Cantitruncated 5-cell prism, Runcitruncated 5-cell prism, Omnitruncated 5-cell prism
Tesseractic prism, Rectified tesseractic prism, Truncated tesseractic prism, Cantellated tesseractic prism, Runcinated tesseractic prism, Bitruncated tesseractic prism, Cantitruncated tesseractic prism, Runcitruncated tesseractic prism, Omnitruncated tesseractic prism
16-cell prism, Truncated 16-cell prism, Runcitruncated 16-cell prism
24-cell prism, rectified 24-cell prism, truncated 24-cell prism, cantellated 24-cell prism, runcinated 24-cell prism, bitruncated 24-cell prism, cantitruncated 24-cell prism, runcitruncated 24-cell prism, omnitruncated 24-cell prism, snub 24-cell prism
120-cell prism, Rectified 120-cell prism, Truncated 120-cell prism, Cantellated 120-cell prism, Runcinated 120-cell prism, Bitruncated 120-cell prism, Cantitruncated 120-cell prism, Runcitruncated 120-cell prism, Omnitruncated 120-cell prism
600-cell prism, Rectified 600-cell prism, Truncated 600-cell prism, Cantellated 600-cell prism, Cantitruncated 600-cell prism, Runcitruncated 600-cell prism
Grand antiprism prism

Honeycombs
5-cubic honeycomb
5-simplex honeycomb
Truncated 5-simplex honeycomb
5-demicubic honeycomb

Six dimensions
Six-dimensional space, 6-polytope and uniform 6-polytope
6-simplex, Rectified 6-simplex, Truncated 6-simplex, Cantellated 6-simplex, Runcinated 6-simplex, Stericated 6-simplex, Pentellated 6-simplex
6-demicube, Truncated 6-demicube, Cantellated 6-demicube, Runcinated 6-demicube, Stericated 6-demicube
6-cube, Rectified 6-cube, 6-cube, Truncated 6-cube, Cantellated 6-cube, Runcinated 6-cube, Stericated 6-cube, Pentellated 6-cube
6-orthoplex, Rectified 6-orthoplex, Truncated 6-orthoplex, Cantellated 6-orthoplex, Runcinated 6-orthoplex, Stericated 6-orthoplex
122 polytope, 221 polytope

Honeycombs
6-cubic honeycomb
6-simplex honeycomb
6-demicubic honeycomb
222 honeycomb

Seven dimensions
Seven-dimensional space, uniform 7-polytope
7-simplex, Rectified 7-simplex, Truncated 7-simplex, Cantellated 7-simplex, Runcinated 7-simplex, Stericated 7-simplex, Pentellated 7-simplex, Hexicated 7-simplex
7-demicube, Truncated 7-demicube, Cantellated 7-demicube, Runcinated 7-demicube, Stericated 7-demicube, Pentellated 7-demicube
7-cube, Rectified 7-cube, 7-cube, Truncated 7-cube, Cantellated 7-cube, Runcinated 7-cube, Stericated 7-cube, Pentellated 7-cube, Hexicated 7-cube
7-orthoplex, Rectified 7-orthoplex, Truncated 7-orthoplex, Cantellated 7-orthoplex, Runcinated 7-orthoplex, Stericated 7-orthoplex, Pentellated 7-orthoplex
132 polytope, 231 polytope, 321 polytope

Honeycombs
7-cubic honeycomb
7-demicubic honeycomb
331 honeycomb, 133 honeycomb

Eight dimension
Eight-dimensional space, uniform 8-polytope
8-simplex, Rectified 8-simplex, Truncated 8-simplex, Cantellated 8-simplex, Runcinated 8-simplex, Stericated 8-simplex, Pentellated 8-simplex, Hexicated 8-simplex, Heptellated 8-simplex
8-orthoplex, Rectified 8-orthoplex, Truncated 8-orthoplex, Cantellated 8-orthoplex, Runcinated 8-orthoplex, Stericated 8-orthoplex, Pentellated 8-orthoplex, Hexicated 8-orthoplex,
8-cube, Rectified 8-cube, Truncated 8-cube, Cantellated 8-cube, Runcinated 8-cube, Stericated 8-cube, Pentellated 8-cube, Hexicated 8-cube, Heptellated 8-cube
8-demicube, Truncated 8-demicube, Cantellated 8-demicube, Runcinated 8-demicube, Stericated 8-demicube, Pentellated 8-demicube, Hexicated 8-demicube
142 polytope, 241 polytope, 421 polytope, Truncated 421 polytope, Truncated 241 polytope, Truncated 142 polytope, Cantellated 421 polytope, Cantellated 241 polytope, Runcinated 421 polytope

Honeycombs
8-cubic honeycomb
8-demicubic honeycomb
521 honeycomb, 251 honeycomb, 152 honeycomb

Nine dimensions
9-polytope
9-cube
9-demicube
9-orthoplex
9-simplex

Hyperbolic honeycombs
E9 honeycomb

Ten dimensions
10-polytope
10-cube
10-demicube
10-orthoplex
10-simplex

Dimensional families
Regular polytope and List of regular polytopes
Simplex
Hypercube
Cross-polytope
Uniform polytope
Demihypercube
Uniform 1k2 polytope
Uniform 2k1 polytope
Uniform k21 polytope

Honeycombs
Hypercubic honeycomb
Alternated hypercubic honeycomb

Geometric operators
Rectification (geometry)
Truncation (geometry)
Bitruncation
Cantellation
Runcination
Sterication
Omnitruncation
Expansion (geometry)
Snub (geometry)
Alternation (geometry)
Dual polyhedron
Gyration (geometry)
Elongation (geometry)
Augmentation (geometry)
Diminishment (geometry)
Greatening (geometry)
Aggrandizement (geometry)
Stellation
Kleetope
Conway polyhedron notation

See also
List of geometry topics

 
 
 
polygons